America First may refer to:

Politics
 America First (policy), a policy and slogan used by United States Presidents Woodrow Wilson, Warren G. Harding, and Donald Trump
 America First Committee, a group that opposed entry of the United States into World War II, founded 1940
 America First Party (1943), an isolationist political party in the United States, founded in 1943
 America First Association of Minnesota, a patriotic propaganda organization established in 1917
 America First: A Budget Blueprint to Make America Great Again, the 2018 United States federal budget
 America First (app), a smartphone app used for the United States presidential campaign of Donald Trump
 America First Policies, a nonprofit organization created in 2017 to promote Trump's "America First" policy agenda
America First Political Action Conference, a white nationalist and far-right event hosted by Nick Fuentes
 by its proponents, as a synonym for Trumpism

Other uses
 "America First" (Homeland), an episode of the American television series Homeland
 America First!: Its History, Politics, and Culture, a 1995 book by Bill Kauffman, United States
 America First Credit Union, a credit union in Utah, United States
 America First Event Center, a multi-purpose arena in Cedar City, Utah, United States
 America First, a political commentary show hosted by Nick Fuentes
 America First with Sebastian Gorka, a syndicated radio show that debuted in 2019

See also
 See America First, a comic opera with music and lyrics by Cole Porter